XHOS-FM is a radio station on 105.7 FM in Ciudad Obregón, Sonora. It is owned by Radio Grupo García de León and is known as La Uni-K with a grupera format.

History
XEOS-AM 1340 received its concession on July 26, 1956. It was owned by María Elena Corral de Millán and broadcast with 250 watts. In 1972, Sistema Radiofónico de Obregón bought XEOS; it was transferred to Sistemas Publicitarios y de Mercadotecnia de Obregón in 1992, and two years later, to Organización Sonora.

In April 2012, XEOS was cleared to move to FM as XHOS-FM 105.7.

References

Radio stations in Sonora